Sudbury Hill Harrow railway station is a National Rail station on the Chiltern Main Line in the London Borough of Harrow in northwest London.

The station is served by Chiltern Railways trains from Marylebone towards High Wycombe and Birmingham Snow Hill, and is in Travelcard Zone 4. This station also has an Oyster card facility located at the entrance and exit. The station is situated between Northolt Park and Sudbury & Harrow Road stations. The station is close to Sudbury Hill Underground station on the Piccadilly line.

History

On 20 November 1905 the Great Central Railway opened a new route for freight trains between Neasden Junction and Northolt Junction. Passenger services from Marylebone began on 1 March 1906, when three new stations were opened: Wembley Hill,  and South Harrow. On 2 April 1906 these services were extended to Northolt Junction. On 19 July 1926 South Harrow station was renamed Sudbury Hill Harrow.

The service was reduced to peak hours only from 7 September 1964, due to a lack of demand. There was a temporary closure from 22 September 1990 to 7 October 1990. In November 2004, however, following concerted efforts by the London Transport Users Committee (now known as London TravelWatch) an hourly off-peak service was introduced.

Services
The Monday-Friday off-peak service in trains per hour (tph) is:
 1 tph to London Marylebone calling at Wembley Stadium
 1 tph to  calling at Northolt Park, West Ruislip and Denham

There is no Saturday or Sunday service.

Connections
London Buses routes 92 and H17 serve the station.

Gallery

Notes

References

External links

Railway stations in the London Borough of Harrow
Former Great Central Railway stations
Railway stations in Great Britain opened in 1906
Railway stations served by Chiltern Railways